Domenico Brandi (1683–1736) was an Italian painter, active in his native Naples, where he painted still lifes of birds and animals, as well as pastoral landscapes (vedute) and a bambocciata. He was the son of the painter Gaetano Brandi, and Domenico initially trained with his uncle, Niccola Maria Rossi, in Naples. He later moved to work under Benedetto Luti in Rome. He was a painter to the Viceroy d'Harrach of Naples, and died in the latter city.

References

1683 births
1736 deaths
17th-century Italian painters
Italian male painters
18th-century Italian painters
Painters from Naples
Italian Baroque painters
Italian still life painters
Italian painters of animals
18th-century Italian male artists